Jonathan may refer to:

 Jon Lee (drummer) (1968–2002), former drummer of Welsh rock band Feeder
 Jon Lee (actor) (born 1982), singer and actor, former S Club 7 member
 Jonathan Lee (novelist) (born 1981), British writer and novelist
 Jonathan Lee (musician) (born 1958), record producer and singer-songwriter from Taiwan
 Jonathan Lee (satirist), British satirist and humorist
 M Jonathan Lee (born 1974), British novelist

See also
 Jonathon Lee (1953–2004), pianist